Zachachye is a rural locality (a village) in Zachachyevskoye Rural Settlement of Kholmogorsky District, Arkhangelsk Oblast, Russia. The population was 108 as of 2010.

Geography 
Zachachye is located on the Bolshaya Chacha River, 112 km southeast of Kholmogory (the district's administrative centre) by road. Podlesye is the nearest rural locality.

References 

Rural localities in Kholmogorsky District
Kholmogorsky Uyezd